This is a list of protected areas of Afghanistan.

Ab-i-Estada Nature Reserve, Ghazni Province
Ajar Valley Nature Reserve, Bamyan Province
Bamiyan National Heritage Park, Bamyan Province
Bamiyan Plateau Protected Landscape, Bamyan Province 
Band-e Amir National Park, Bamyan Province 
Darqad (Takhar) Wildlife Reserve, Takhar Province
Dasht-i-Nawar Waterfowl Sanctuary, Ghazni Province
Hamun-i-Puzak Waterfowl Sanctuary, Farah and Nimroz provinces
Imam Sahib (Kunduz) Wildlife Reserve, Kunduz Province
Khulm Landmark Protected Area, Balkh Province
Koh-e Baba (Shah Foladi) Protected Landscape, Bamyan province
Kol-i-Hashmat Khan Waterfowl Sanctuary, Kabul Province
Northwest Afghanistan Game Managed Reserve, Herat Province
Nuristan National Park and Wildlife Reserve, Nuristan Province
Pamir-i-Buzurg Wildlife Reserve, Badakhshan Province
Registan Desert Wildlife Managed Reserve, Kandahar Province 
Wakhan National Park, Badakhshan Province
Zadran National Reserve, Paktia Province

References

 
Protected areas of Asia
Afghanistan
Protected areas
Protected areas